The Chambersburg and Shippensburg Railway was an interurban trolley system of the early 20th century in south central Pennsylvania. Built in 1914, the line ran from Chambersburg to Shippensburg. The line was abandoned at the same time as much of the nearby Chambersburg, Greencastle and Waynesboro Street Railway, on July 31, 1926.

Had the Cumberland Railway venture from Carlisle to Shippensburg succeeded, there would have been continuous trolley service from Harrisburg to the Mason–Dixon line, where the Shady Grove station provided a transfer to the standard-gauge Hagerstown and Frederick Railway in Maryland.

The C&S used a  broad gauge, similar to other Pennsylvania interurban lines.

See also
 Chambersburg and Gettysburg Electric Railway

References 

Defunct Pennsylvania railroads
Interurban railways in Pennsylvania
Transportation in Franklin County, Pennsylvania
American companies established in 1914 
Railway companies established in 1914 
Railway companies disestablished in 1928
5 ft 2½ in gauge railways in the United States
1914 establishments in Pennsylvania
1928 disestablishments in Pennsylvania